Monochroa servella is a moth of the family Gelechiidae. It is found from Fennoscandia to Italy and from Portugal to Bulgaria and Russia.

The wingspan is 11–13 mm. Adults are on wing in June.

The larvae feed on Primula farinosa and Primula veris. They mine the leaves of their host plant. The mine has the form of a large, transparent, full depth blotch that starts in the basal part of the leaf. Most frass is deposited in the first part of the mine. The mine is strongly folded lengthwise. Full-grown larvae leave the mine to pupate. They attach the pupa to the apical part of a fresh leave. Larvae can be found in May. They are dark red, mottled with greyish white.

References

Moths described in 1839
Monochroa
Moths of Europe